Northern Cape (formerly Griqualand West) is a first-class cricket team that nominally represents the South African province of Northern Cape in the CSA Provincial Competitions. The team is selected and supported by Northern Cape Cricket and plays its home games at the De Beers Diamond Oval in Kimberley. 

At organisational level, Northern Cape Cricket is responsible for the administration and development of cricket in the province and among its primary functions are management and promotion of the Northern Cape team. Originally founded sometime before 1884 as the Kimberley Cricket Club, the organization developed at provincial level as the Griqualand West Cricket Board until 2015 when it was renamed Northern Cape Cricket to comply with a government directive that provincial sporting bodies should have their governance structure aligned with the geo-political structure of the country.

The team was called Kimberley to 1890–91 and Griqualand West to 2014–15. It has been called Northern Cape from the beginning of the 2015–16 season. For the purposes of the SuperSport (now Sunfoil) Series, Griqualand West merged with Free State to form the VKB Knights (originally the Diamond Eagles) from October 2004, but Griqualand West (renamed Northern Cape in 2015) has retained its independent status as a team in the CSA Provincial Competitions.

Honours
 Currie Cup (1) – 1890–91
 Standard Bank Cup (1) – 1998–99
 South African Airways Provincial Three-Day Challenge (4) – 2004–05, 2007–08, 2008-09, 2011-12
 South African Airways Provincial One-Day Challenge (0)
 Gillette/Nissan Cup (0)

Team history
Beginning as Kimberley Cricket Club, the team is first recorded in the 1884–85 season playing in the Champion Bat Tournament. In 1888–89, they won two odds matches against the English touring team known then as R. G. Warton's XI. As a result of those victories, Kimberley were awarded the new Currie Cup as the most accomplished domestic team in South Africa. In the 1889–90 season, they were successfully challenged for the trophy by Transvaal but they recovered it in 1890–91. The first matches as Griqualand West were played in December 1890 for the Champion Bat Tournament and, from 1891–92, the team was known by its provincial name only. 

In 1897, the Barnato Memorial Trophy was given to the Griqualand West Coloured Cricket Board, a union for all black cricket players that had been set up in 1892. Griqualand West participated in the first Barnato Tournament in 1898–99, along with Eastern Province, Queenstown, Southern Border, and Western Province. In 1904, Griqualand West was one of the three founding members of the South African Coloured Cricket Board (SACCB). In total, there were thirteen editions of the SACCB-run Barnato Cup tournaments, which were played between 1904 and 1951–52. Griqualand West won the competition in 1910 and hosted it in 1904 and 1913.

In 2004–05, the format of the Sunfoil (then SuperSport) Series was changed, with the reduction of eleven provincial teams into six franchises. After missing the first season of the franchise tournament due to a legal dispute, Griqualand West partnered Free State to create the then Diamond Eagles who were renamed VKB Knights ahead of the 2010–11 season. Just before the beginning of the 2015–16 season it was announced that the organisation was to be renamed Northern Cape Cricket, in line with the national government directive that provincial sporting bodies should have their governance structure aligned with the geo-political structure of the country.

Venues
Venues have included:
 Eclectics Cricket Club Ground, Kimberley (1889–1914)
 Athletic Club Ground, Kimberley (1920–1927)
 De Beers Stadium, Kimberley (1927–1973)
 Christian Brothers College, Kimberley (Dec 1951–Jan 1952)
 De Beers Diamond Oval, Kimberley (1973–present)

Squad
In April 2021, Cricket South Africa confirmed the following squad ahead of the 2021–22 season.

 Aubrey Swanepoel
 Beyers Swanepoel
 Ernest Kemm
 Kagiso Mohale
 Andrew Rasemene
 Evan Jones
 Rivaldo Moonsamy
 Jonathan Vandiar
 Victor Mahlangu
 Isaac Dikgale
 Johan van Dyk

References

Further reading
 South African Cricket Annual – various editions
 Wisden Cricketers' Almanack – various editions

South African first-class cricket teams
Kimberley, Northern Cape
Cricket in the Northern Cape
Cricket team